Brigadier General (Ret.) Ronald Paul Welch (born January 9, 1960) was an American Military officer and the former Director of the Joint Staff of the Connecticut National Guard. He began his military service in 1978 when he enlisted in United States Army and served as an NCO in 2nd Bn (Ranger) 75th Infantry. He was later commissioned, through Connecticut Military Academy in August 1984 through the Officer Candidate School.

Education
1985: Mohegan Community College, Associate in Science, Norwich, CT

1992: Eastern Connecticut State University, Bachelor of General Studies, Willimantic, CT

2007: Eastern Connecticut State University, Master of Science in Organizational Management, Willimantic, CT

2011: U.S. Army War College, Master of Strategic Studies

Military career

United States Army
Ron Welch enlisted in the United States Army in on October 3, 1978, where he served on active duty with the 2nd Ranger Battalion of the 75th Ranger Regiment at Fort Lewis, Washington.  During his active duty service he attained the rank of sergeant and completed Basic Airborne School, Ranger School, Jungle Warfare Course, USMC Amphibious Recon Scout Swimmer Course, Jumpmaster Course, Primary Non Commission Officer Course, USMC Scout Sniper Course, Emergency Medical Technician Course, Special Operations and Tactics Course, and the Pathfinder School.  On May 4, 1981, he sustained serious injuries during an in-line of duty parachute accident. He left active service on October 2, 1982.

Connecticut National Guard
After leaving active service, Welch joined the Connecticut National Guard, where he attended Officer Candidate School in 1983.  On August 11, 1984, he was commissioned as a second lieutenant in the infantry.  He then served in numerous positions in the Connecticut National Guard's Infantry units as a rifle platoon leader, company commander and various staff positions. He also served as an operations officer in a Combat Engineer battalion.  While as a member of the National Guard, Welch graduated from The Infantry Officer Basic Course, Master Fitness Trainer Course, Air Assault Course, Infantry Officers Advanced Courses, NBC Officer/NCO Defense Course, Rappel Master Course, Combined Arms Service Staff School, Command and General Staff College,  Israeli Defense Force Airborne Center, the US Army War College, Army Combat Lifesaver Course, Joint Task Force Commander Training Course, Dual Status Commander Orientation Course, Leadership in Homeland Security Course, Advanced Joint Professional Military Education, the General & Flag Officer Homeland Security Executive Seminar.

Operation Enduring Freedom
Welch deployed to Afghanistan from 2005 to 2006 as a senior American advisor to an Afghan National Army, Infantry Brigade located in Eastern Afghanistan, providing training, advice and conducting combat operations.  While in Afghanistan, he continued to advise units of the Connecticut National Guard in preparing them for their deployments to Afghanistan. His main advice was to learn the culture, the language and customs while continuing traditional military skills such as physical fitness and marksmanship.

Soldier’s Medal
On December 11, 1992, during an intense winter storm, a dispatcher from the Fairfield, Connecticut, fire department called the Stratford Armory for assistance evacuating residents. Then Captain Welch and four others, Sergeants First Class Roger G. Barr, Douglas E. Bell, Raymond C. Spry and Specialist Chi Tranh Chong, drove to the scene in a canvas-covered military truck.  They rescued 34 personnel, including a 94-year-old woman and students from nearby Fairfield University.  The soldiers had to evacuate the vehicles, wade through chest-high water of 42 degrees and carry the victims to the truck.  While attempting to leave the flooded area, the truck stalled in the rising flood waters.  The team was able to secure some small boats drifting in the water and used them to hand tow the victims to a waiting fire boat.  Others were brought to a small dry piece of land, where they were eventually rescued by helicopter.

Assignments
 August 1984 – May 1985, rifle platoon leader Company B, 1st Battalion, 169th Infantry, 43rd Infantry Brigade, 26th Infantry Division, Manchester, Connecticut
 May 1985 – March 1987, company executive officer, Headquarters Company, 1st Battalion, 169th Infantry, 43rd Infantry Brigade, 26th Infantry Division, Manchester, Connecticut
 March 1987 – April 1988, battalion tactical intelligence officer, (BICC), 1st Battalion, 169th Infantry, 43rd Infantry Brigade, 26th Infantry Division, Manchester, Connecticut
 April 1988 – November 1988, battalion S-3 (Air), 1st Battalion, 169th Infantry, 43rd Infantry Brigade, 26th Infantry Division, Manchester, Connecticut
 November 1988 – November 1989, company commander, Headquarters, 1st Battalion, 169th Infantry, 43rd Infantry Brigade, 26th Infantry Division, Manchester, Connecticut
 November 1989 – June 1990, battalion S-2, 1st Battalion, 169th Infantry, 43rd Infantry Brigade, 26th Infantry Division, Manchester, Connecticut
 June 1990 – July 1990, battalion S-1, 143rd Forward Support Battalion, 43rd Infantry Brigade, 26th Infantry Division, Waterbury, Connecticut
 July 1990 – February 1991, battalion S-2, 2nd Battalion, 102nd Infantry, 43rd Infantry Brigade, 26th Infantry Division, Meriden, Connecticut
 February 1991 – March 1992, battalion S-1, 2nd Battalion, 102nd Infantry, 43rd Infantry Brigade, 26th Infantry Division, Meriden, Connecticut
 March 1992 – January 1993, battalion operations officer, Headquarters Company, 242nd Combat Engineer Battalion, Connecticut Army National Guard, Stratford, Connecticut
 January 1993 – April 1995, battalion assistant S-3, Headquarters Company, 242nd Combat Engineer Battalion, Connecticut Army National Guard, Stratford, Connecticut
 April 1995 – August 1995, instructor, Connecticut Military Academy, Connecticut Army National Guard, Niantic, Connecticut
 August 1995 – January 1996, senior instructor, Connecticut Military Academy, Connecticut Army National Guard Niantic, Connecticut
 January 1996 – February 1997, executive officer/operations officer, Northeast Leadership Training Brigade, Connecticut Army National Guard, Niantic, Connecticut
 February 1997 – October 1998, operations officer, Headquarters, 169th Leadership Regiment, Connecticut Army National Guard, Niantic, Connecticut
 October 1998 – August 1999, brigade S-3, Headquarters, 85th Troop Command, State Area Command, New London, Connecticut
 August 1999 – January 2000, brigade S-1, Headquarters, 85th Troop Command, State Area Command, New London, Connecticut
 January 2000 – August 2000, commander, 1st OCS Battalion, Headquarters, 169th Leadership Regiment, Connecticut Army National Guard, Niantic, Connecticut
 August 2000 – November 2003, brigade S-3, Headquarters, 85th Troop Command, State Area Command, New London, Connecticut
 November 2003 – March 2004, commander 14th Civil Support Team, Connecticut National Guard, Hartford, Connecticut
 March 2004 – May 2005, J5/director of Military Support, Connecticut National Guard, Hartford, Connecticut
 May 2005 – June 2005, brigade advisory team leader (ETT), FT Carson, Colorado
 June 2005 – June 2006, brigade advisory team leader (ETT), CJTF Phoenix, Afghanistan
 June 2006 – March 2007, J5/director of military support, Joint Force Headquarters – CT, Connecticut National Guard, Hartford, Connecticut
 April 2007 – June 2008, J3/director of operations, Joint Force Headquarters – CT, Connecticut National Guard, Hartford, Connecticut
 July 2008 – May 2010, chief of staff, Joint Force Headquarters – CT, Connecticut National Guard, Hartford, Connecticut
 May 2010 – August 2012, commander, 85th Troop Command, Connecticut Army National Guard, Niantic, Connecticut
 August 2012 – February 2014, chief of staff, Joint Force Headquarters – CT, Connecticut National Guard, Hartford, Connecticut
 February 2014 – present, director, Joint Staff, Joint Force Headquarters – CT, Connecticut National Guard, Hartford, Connecticut

Awards and decorations

Effective dates of promotion

References

Military personnel from Connecticut
Living people
United States Army generals
National Guard (United States) generals
Recipients of the Soldier's Medal
Eastern Connecticut State University alumni
United States Army War College alumni
1960 births
Connecticut National Guard personnel